Eponina breyeri is a species of beetle in the family Cerambycidae. It was described by Prosen in 1954.

References

Aerenicini
Beetles described in 1954